The Honourables is a Ugandan political satire-drama series that premiered on NTV Uganda on 9 January 2017, starring Hellen Lukoma, Symon Base Kalema, Aisha Kyomuhangi, Philip Luswata, Malaika, Doreen Mirembe, Candy Mutesi, Patricko Mujuuka and singer Stecia Mayanja. The series which was also later picked up by Pearl Magic in 2018 exposes the vices of MPs and other government officials who frequent a local bar in Kampala, showing their greed, corruption, adultery and many other vices.

Awards

References

External links 

2017 Ugandan television series debuts
English-language television shows
2010s Ugandan television series
Ugandan drama television series
NTV Uganda original programming
Pearl Magic original programming